Wolfgang "Maxe" Steinbach (born  21 September 1954) is an East German former footballer and manager who spent most of his career playing for 1. FC Magdeburg in the DDR-Oberliga. In 2006, he was elected Best 1. FC Magdeburg Player of All Times in a telephone vote.

Playing career
Steinbach was born in Schönebeck. He started his top flight career at 1. FC Magdeburg when he played in a single match in the 1971–72 season. He had his breakthrough in the 1974–75 season when he played in 17 matches, scoring 2 goals. He stayed with 1. FC Magdeburg until 1987, when he left for his home town club of Motor Schönebeck where he spent the next one and a half years in the second-tier DDR-Liga. In the winterbreak of the 1988–89 season he returned to the DDR-Oberliga with 1. FC Magdeburg. After German reunification, Steinbach was signed by West German 2. Bundesliga side VfB Oldenburg. He spent the rest of his playing career with them, managing the team for a time in the 1993–94 season. Overall, Steinbach played in 337 DDR-Oberliga matches, scoring 75 goals. In the 2. Bundesliga he played another 104 matches with 10 goals scored.

From 1978 to 1985 he earned 28 caps to the East Germany national team, scoring one goal. He was part of the East Germany squad that won the Silver medal at the 1980 Olympic Games in Moscow. He played in all matches in the tournament, scoring one goal. He was sent off in the final against Czechoslovakia.

With 1. FC Magdeburg, Steinbach won three East German championships and four FDGB-Pokal titles.

Coaching career
Following his playing career, Steinbach took up managing, starting at VfB Oldenburg in 1993–94. He returned to Oldenburg in 1999, staying at the helm until the 2001–02 season. Later he spent four years with then-Oberliga Nord side SV Wilhelmshaven where he won promotion to third-tier Regionalliga Nord in 2006. Following a lengthy spell of unsuccessful matches, he was sacked on 3 April 2007. From July 2007 to May 2008, he was manager of Verbandsliga Sachsen-Anhalt side Preußen Magdeburg. Since October 2008 he has the role of director of sports at SV Wilhelmshaven, but took over as manager again in the spring of 2009.

Honours
 DDR-Oberliga: 1971–72, 1973–74, 1974–75
 FDGB-Pokal: 1973, 1978, 1979, 1983

References

1954 births
Living people
People from Schönebeck
People from Bezirk Magdeburg
German footballers
East German footballers
Footballers from Saxony-Anhalt
East Germany international footballers
DDR-Oberliga players
1. FC Magdeburg players
Olympic footballers of East Germany
Footballers at the 1980 Summer Olympics
Olympic silver medalists for East Germany
Olympic medalists in football
Medalists at the 1980 Summer Olympics
Association football midfielders
Recipients of the Patriotic Order of Merit in bronze
German football managers
VfB Oldenburg managers
BV Cloppenburg managers
SV Wilhelmshaven managers